Manuel Guerra Pérez (18 July 1928 – 7 October 2020) was a Spanish backstroke and freestyle swimmer. He competed in three events at the 1948 Summer Olympics.

References

External links
 

1928 births
2020 deaths
Spanish male backstroke swimmers
Spanish male freestyle swimmers
Olympic swimmers of Spain
Swimmers at the 1948 Summer Olympics
Sportspeople from Las Palmas
20th-century Spanish people